Mojtaba Shaban (born 18 March 1987 in Semnan) is an Iranian professional volleyball player.

He was a member of the Iran national under-19 team that won the 2007 FIVB Boys' U19 Volleyball World Championship.

Honours

National team

Asian Junior Championship
Gold medal (1): 2008
World Youth Championship
Gold medal (1): 2007
Asian Youth Championship
Gold medal (1): 2007

Club
Asian Championship
Gold medal (1): 2010 (Paykan)
Iranian Super League
Champions (1): 2010 (Paykan)

Individual
MVP:: 2007 Asian Youth Championship

References

 FIVB biography

Iranian men's volleyball players
Living people
1987 births
People from Semnan, Iran